Sevastopol Bay is a city harbor that includes a series of smaller bays carved out its shores. The bay of Sevastopol splits the city of Sevastopol into the Southern side and the Northern side.

The bay of Sevastopol stretches from the open sea eastward to the Inkerman Cave Monastery at the end, narrowing down and finishing at the mouth of the Chorna River. The bay forms the seaward approach to the city. Covering a large expanse of water, the harbor serves as a comfortable anchorage for a fleet. From the beginning of the 20th century it housed cruisers and ironclads. 

The number of piers along the shores of the harbor far exceeds the number of bays. The bay serves as a home to a commercial port as well as a naval base. Just outside of Sevastopol Bay is located a fishing port.

See also
 Port of Sevastopol

References

External links
 Description of Sevastopol Harbor
 Description of all bays around Sevastopol
 More information (aerial photo)

Bays of Sevastopol